SNAC (Social Networks and Archival Context) is a project collecting and integrating biographical and social data.

SNAC may also refer to:

 Scaphoid non-union advanced collapse, a medical condition of the wrist
 Somali National Academy of Culture
 Single Network Access Code, the country code for the Inmarsat satellite phone network
 Scientific Nutrition for Advanced Conditioning, aka SNAC Nutrition, a company
 , a French lobby association of authors and composers
 SNOAC, a chemical substance
 snoaC, a gene

See also 
 Snack (disambiguation)
 Snap (disambiguation)